Herkley Vaz is a Jamaican former footballer who played as a defender with the Jamaica national football team.

Club career 
Vaz played in the National Soccer League in 1966 with Sudbury Italia. In 1967, he had a trial with the Atlanta Chiefs.

International career 
Vaz made his debut for the Jamaica national football team on January 23, 1965, against the Netherlands Antilles national football team. He represented Jamaica in the 1966 FIFA World Cup qualification (CONCACAF).

References  

Association football defenders
Jamaican footballers
Jamaica international footballers
Jamaican expatriate footballers
Canadian National Soccer League players